Ju Chao (1811–1865), a native of Panyu (番禺), now Guangzhou, was a famed Chinese painter in the Qing dynasty.  His courtesy name was Meisheng (梅生), and pseudonym Meichao (梅巢) or Guquan.  He was the older brother (or cousin) of the painter Ju Lian. He wrote "Poems of Shouxie Shi" (首邪室诗) and "Yanyu Ci" (烟语词).

Notes

References
 Ci hai bian ji wei yuan hui (辞海编辑委员会). Ci hai (辞海). Shanghai: Shanghai ci shu chu ban she (上海辞书出版社), 1979.

Qing dynasty painters
1811 births
1899 deaths
People from Panyu District
Artists from Guangzhou
Qing dynasty poets
Writers from Guangzhou
Poets from Guangdong
Painters from Guangdong
19th-century Chinese poets
19th-century Chinese painters